The Scientific Committee on Antarctic Research (SCAR) is an interdisciplinary body of the International Science Council (ISC). SCAR coordinates international scientific research efforts in Antarctica, including the Southern Ocean.

SCAR's scientific work is administered through several discipline-themed science groups. The organisation has observer status at, and provides independent advice to Antarctic Treaty Consultative Meetings, and also provides information to other international bodies such as the Intergovernmental Panel on Climate Change (IPCC) and the United Nations Framework Convention on Climate Change (UNFCCC).

History
At the International Council of Scientific Unions (ICSU)’s Antarctic meeting held in Stockholm from 9–11 September 1957, it was agreed that a committee should be created to oversee scientific research in Antarctica. At the time there were 12 nations actively conducting Antarctic research and they were each invited to nominate one delegate to join a Special Committee on Antarctic Research. The 12 nations were Argentina, Australia, Belgium, Chile, France, Japan, New Zealand, Norway, South Africa, United Kingdom, United States, and USSR.

The Special Committee held its first meeting in the Hague from 3–6 February 1958 and elected its first Executive Committee - Ing. Gen. G. Laclavère as president, Professor K.E. Bullen as vice president, and Dr V. Schytt as secretary. A Finance Committee and three working groups were also formed at this meeting.

The organisation’s name was later changed to the Scientific Committee on Antarctic Research.

Structure 
SCAR is currently made up of 32 full member countries and 12 associate member countries. Each full member country appoints a permanent delegate and an alternate delegate; associate member countries appoint just one delegate. The delegates meet every two years to decide on SCAR's strategic direction and which delegates to elect to the Executive Committee.

The role of the Executive Committee is to work with the SCAR Secretariat (based at the Scott Polar Research Institute in Cambridge, England) to carry out decisions made by the Delegates. The Executive Committee is made up of a president, an immediate past-president, four vice-presidents and the executive director of SCAR.

Activities

Meetings 
One of the ways that SCAR brings researchers together is through meetings. These include biennial Open Science Conferences (OSCs), Delegate Meetings, the SCAR Biology Symposium (every 4 years), the International Symposium on Antarctic Earth Sciences, and the Humanities and Social Science Symposium.

Open Science Conferences 
SCAR has been organising biennial Open Science Conferences (OSCs) in various member countries including Germany, Australia, Russia, Argentina, USA, New Zealand, Malaysia and Switzerland, since 2004. The OSCs give Antarctic scientists opportunities to draw attention to Antarctic issues, hold scientific group meetings, share their work, and network.

Due to the COVID-19 pandemic, the physical 2020 conference and meetings scheduled to take place in Hobart, Australia, were cancelled. SCAR 2020 Online was held online from 3–7 August and delivered the highlights of the conference through a combination of live streaming, recorded presentations, text-based chat and a poster gallery. The 2022 OSC was also held online with live and recorded presentations, virtual networking, and an online poster gallery. Future meetings will use an innovative hybrid format going forwards.

Science 
Over 30 groups coordinate Antarctic research across a variety of disciplines and themes through SCAR. SCAR has three permanent science groups:

 Geosciences
 Life Sciences
 Physical Sciences

Each science group encompasses scientific research programmes (SRPs) in priority areas. SRPs have a lifetime of about eight years and new programmes can be suggested and developed through programme planning groups (PPGs).

In 2018, a permanent Standing Committee on the Humanities and Social Sciences was set up to recognise the important and growing contribution of the humanities and social sciences communities to Antarctic research. Antarctica's human history is relatively recent and this important area of study explores how humans interact with the region.

Each science group also has action groups (AGs), which have a lifetime of two to four years and are intended to solve short-term issues, and wider-focus expert groups (EGs), which last between six and eight years. Examples include the AntArchitecture Action Group, the Expert Group on Birds and Marine Mammals, the Earth Observation Action Group, and the Action Group on Meeting and Managing Antarctic Environments.

Policy 
One aspect of SCAR's work is identifying emerging issues from Antarctic and Southern Ocean research and bringing them to the attention of policymakers, including the Antarctic Treaty, the UNFCCC and IPCC. Environmental and conservation related science is a large and growing part of SCAR's policy work.

In 2002 SCAR received the prestigious Prince of Asturias Award for International Cooperation.

SCAR provides independent scientific advice to the Antarctic Treaty Consultative Meetings via its Standing Committee on the Antarctic Treaty System (SCATS). SCATS brings together global scientists to create papers on the status of particular areas of research, to present at the Antarctic Treaty Consultative Meetings. SCAR is also tasked with providing advice to a number of other bodies, including the Commission for the Conservation of Antarctic Marine Living Resources.

In 2019, SCAR's long-standing contribution to the Antarctic Treaty System was recognised by the passing of a resolution calling for the representative countries’ Governments to enhance support, collaboration and cooperation in scientific research and protective measures for Antarctica.

In 2022 the "Antarctic Climate Change and the Environment" report was published for the Antarctic Treaty Consultative Meeting in Berlin. The report summarises a decade of research on the impact of climate change on Antarctica and the Southern Ocean, and the global effects of these changes. The report's findings were summarised in an animation titled "Our Future Depends on Us".

Capacity Building

Medals 
SCAR awards four medals at its biennial Open Science Conferences, in recognition of excellence in Antarctic and Southern Ocean research and outstanding service to the international Antarctic community, these are:

 The Medal for Excellence in Antarctic Research
 The Medal for International Coordination
 The Medal for Education and Communication 
 The President’s Medal for Outstanding Achievement

Visiting Scholarships 
SCAR offers Visiting Scholar Awards, which enable researchers and academics to visit other SCAR member countries.

Fellowships 
SCAR provides fellowships to early-career researchers to allow them to join research groups in other countries.

Diversity in Antarctic Science 
As one of the principles of its parent organisation, the International Science Council (ISC), SCAR ‘promotes equitable opportunities for access to science and its benefits, and opposes discrimination based on such factors as ethnic origin, religion, citizenship, language, political or other opinion, sex, gender identity, sexual orientation, disability, or age.’

As part of the push to improve the representation of women on Wikipedia, the SCAR community has already included more than 70 new biographies for notable women in Antarctic research.

In 2022 SCAR established an Equality, Diversity and Inclusion (EDI) Action Group tasked with identifying how EDI issues can be effectively dealt with within SCAR, and what practical actions can be taken.

References

External links

Organizations established in 1958
Scientific organisations based in the United Kingdom
Antarctica research agencies
1958 establishments in Antarctica
International Council for Science
Organisations associated with the University of Cambridge